Itchen Abbas is a village on the River Itchen about  north-east of Winchester in Hampshire, England. The village is part of the Itchen Valley civil parish.

A major oil pipeline from Hamble to Aldermaston runs through Itchen Abbas.

Parish church
The Church of England parish church of St. John the Baptist was originally Norman and retains an original Norman doorway and chancel arch. St. John's was rebuilt in 1867 to a Norman Revival design by the architect William Coles. It is a charming Victorian Church with a barrel-vaulted roof. The church lost all remaining Victorian fittings when it was re-ordered in 2009; the pews replaced with stackable chairs, and the original floor covered with carpeting, leaving the church with a much-impaired acoustic, and a rather bland interior.

History
Itchen Abbas is mentioned in the Hampshire Folk Song "Avington Pond" as the place where the builders of the pond were paid their wages. They were given their money in the Plough public house.

Originally a rectory, it was altered in the 19th century.

The Alton, Alresford and Winchester Railway opened Itchen Abbas railway station in 1865. British Railways closed the line and station in 1973.

Charles Kingsley was a regular visitor to Itchen Abbas. The village and river provided inspiration for the setting of his novel The Water Babies.

The village is the site of Sir Edward Grey's fishing hut, where he spent the night of 3 August 1914 before travelling to London to announce the United Kingdom's entry into First World War.

References

Sources and further reading

External links

Villages in Hampshire